Lake Helen is a city in Volusia County, Florida, United States. The population was 2,624 at the 2010 census.

Lake Helen was named after the daughter of its founder, Henry DeLand.

Geography

Lake Helen is located at  (28.983463, –81.232870).

Demographics

As of the census of 2000, there were 2,743 people, 1,124 households, and 774 families residing in the city. The racial makeup of the city was 87.02% White, 10.68% African American, 0.29% Native American, 0.29% Asian, 0.04% Pacific Islander, 0.95% from other races, and 0.73% from two or more races. Hispanic or Latino of any race were 2.95% of the population.

There were 1,124 households, out of which 26.0% had children under the age of 18 living with them, 52.0% were married couples living together, 12.8% had a female householder with no husband present, and 31.1% were non-families. 25.7% of all households were made up of individuals, and 11.2% had someone living alone who was 65 years of age or older.  The average household size was 2.44 and the average family size was 2.91.

In the city, the population was spread out, with 22.3% under the age of 18, 6.7% from 18 to 24, 24.6% from 25 to 44, 25.7% from 45 to 64, and 20.7% who were 65 years of age or older.  The median age was 43 years. For every 100 females, there were 89.8 males.  For every 100 females age 18 and over, there were 85.1 males.

The median income for a household in the city was $34,577, and the median income for a family was $39,688. Males had a median income of $30,000 versus $22,774 for females. The per capita income for the city was $17,158.  About 7.5% of families and 9.7% of the population were below the poverty line, including 9.4% of those under age 18 and 11.2% of those age 65 or over.

In the media

An episode of WCW Monday Nitro from February 17, 1997, featured a home movie filmed during the preceding week by NWO members Kevin Nash, Scott Hall and Syxx. In the video the three are driving through Lake Helen as the city's name appears on the side of a building that is captured on the video. The NWO members cross paths with the Steiner Brothers in their car and run them off the road.

Notable people

Civil rights attorney and leader Isiah C. Smith was born in Lake Helen.

References

Cities in Volusia County, Florida
Cities in Florida